Menntaskólinn við Sund (MS) is a secondary school in Reykjavík founded in 1969. At the time, there were only 4 other such schools in Iceland. It was originally named Menntaskólinn við Tjörnina (College by the Pond).

Some of the school's former students include Ingibjörg Sólrún Gísladóttir, Katrín Jakobsdóttir, Þorgerður Katrín Gunnarsdóttir and Jón Þór Birgisson.

Secondary schools in Iceland
Educational institutions established in 1969
1969 establishments in Iceland